Springvale Cemetery station was a railway station in Melbourne, Australia, serving the Springvale Cemetery. It had its own branch line, which split from the Cranbourne and Pakenham lines at Springvale station. It was opened in March 1904, to transport coffins, passengers and staff to the cemetery, and closed during 1952, at a time when many small branch lines were being closed by Victorian Railways.

References

Disused railway stations in Melbourne
Railway stations in Australia opened in 1904
Railway stations closed in 1952